Thrips angusticeps is an insect of the order Thysanoptera and the family of Thripidae. It is a pest on crops of flax, cereals and peas.

References

External links

Agricultural pest insects
Thripidae
Insects described in 1895